Violetta Ferrari (25 April 1930 – 23 January 2014) was a Hungarian actress. She died on 23 January 2014, aged 83, in Budapest.

Selected filmography
Paprika (1959)
 Grounds for Divorce (1960)

References

External links

1930 births
2014 deaths
People from Hódmezővásárhely
Hungarian film actresses
Hungarian television actresses
Hungarian stage actresses
Hungarian people of Italian descent
Hungarian expatriates in Austria
Hungarian expatriates in West Germany